San Paolo di Jesi is a comune (municipality) in the Province of Ancona in the Italian region Marche, located about  southwest of Ancona.

San Paolo di Jesi borders the following municipalities: Cupramontana, Jesi, Monte Roberto, Staffolo.

References

Cities and towns in the Marche